Saad el-Din Mohamed el-Husseiny el-Shazly‎ (1 April 1922 – 10 February 2011)was an Egyptian military commander. He was Egypt's chief of staff during the October War. Following his public criticism of the Camp David Accords, he resigned from his post as Ambassador to Britain and Portugal and went to Algeria as a political refugee.

He is credited with the equipping and preparation of the Egyptian Armed Forces in the years prior to the successful capture of the Israeli Bar-Lev line at the start of the 1973 war. He was dismissed from his post on 13 December 1973.

Early life 
He was born in the village of Shabratna, Basyoun Center, in Gharbia Governorate, in the Nile Delta, on April 1, 1922, in an upper-middle class family. His father was a notary, and his family owned (70) acres. His father is Hajj al-Husseini al-Shazly, and his mother, Mrs. Tafidah al-Jawhari, is the second wife of his father. He was named after the leader Saad Zaghloul. His father was one of the owners of agricultural lands who married twice and had nine children with first wife: Muhammad, Hamid, Abdel-Hakim, Al-Hussaini, Abdel-Salam, Nadhima, Farida, Bassima and Morsyah.  As for the second wife, Al-Jawhari, she is the mother of Shazly.

His father's cousin is Abd al-Salam Pasha Al-Shazly, who took over the lake directorate and the Ministry of Awqaf.

El-Shazly received sciences in the elementary school in Basioun School, which is about 6 kilometers from his village. After completing his primary education at age 11, his father moved to live in Cairo and he completed the preparatory and secondary levels in Cairo schools.

Commands Held 

 He joined the Military Academy in February 1939 and was the youngest student in his class.
 He graduated from the Military College in July 1940 with the rank of a lieutenant in the infantry in the same class of Khaled Mohieddin.
 In 1943, while a lieutenant, he was chosen to serve in the Royal Guard.
 He participated in the Second World War.
 Participated in the 1948 Palestine War.
 Founder and Commander of the First Parachute Battalion in Egypt (1954 - 1961).
 Commander of the 75th Parachute Battalion during the Tripartite Aggression.
 Commander of the UAR Battalion in the United Nations Operation in the Congo (1960-1961).
 London War Attaché (1961-1963).
 Commander of the 1st Infantry Brigade (participated in the (Yemen War) (1965 - 1966).
 Commander of the Special Forces (Parachutes and Thunderbolts) (1967-1969).
 Commander of the Red Sea Military Region (1970 - 1971).
 Chief of Staff of the Egyptian Armed Forces (1971-1973).
 Assistant Secretary General of the League of Arab States for Military Affairs (1971 - 1973).
 Egyptian Ambassador to Britain (1974-1975).
 Egyptian Ambassador to Portugal (1975-1978).

Social Status 
Al-Shazly got married on December 13, 1943 to Zeenat Muhammad Metwally Al-Suhaimi, daughter of Muhammad Metwally Pasha Al-Suhaimi, who was the director of the Military College in the 1930s, and had three daughters: Shahdan, Nahid and Samia.

Involvement in the Free Officers Movement 
His relationship with Gamal Abdel Nasser began when he lived in the same building that Gamal Abdel Nasser inhabited in Abbasiya before the July 23 movement.  They had family relations, and in addition to being officers teachers in the School of Administrative Affairs, they met on a daily basis. Jamal Abdel Nasser opened it to the Free Officers in 1951, and Al-Shazly welcomed the idea and joined them, but he did not participate in the night of July 23, 1952 directly, as he was in a college course  Pillars of the war.

Airborne Corps 
At the rank of major, he traveled to the United States of America on an advanced training mission in 1953 to specialized in parachutes and was one of the first officers to receive the Rangers School course. He then became the commander of the 75th Parachute Battalion during the Triple Aggression of 1956. He took command of the Parachute Force during the period from 1954 to 1959.

During the celebrations of the Revolution Day, which was to be held on July 23, 1954, Al-Shazly suggested to Major General Naguib Ghoneim, the commander of the Cairo military region, to show the parachute corps differently from the rest of the armed forces units that were walking in the normal step in front of the podium, as is well known. He suggested that the parachute corps parade walk by a quick step in front of the podium, and by that, he was the first to suggest walking in a quick step in the special military parades for the paratroopers, which became associated with the thunderbolt and paratroop forces and what distinguished them from other forces and were subsequently transferred by the Arab countries.

UN Mission in Congo 
In 1960 (during the unity with Syria), President Gamal Abdel Nasser sent a parachute battalion as part of the United Nations forces to Congo, led by Colonel Al Shazly, at the request of Prime Minister Lumumba and in coordination with the United Nations Secretary-General Dag Hammarskjöld, to maintain security and law and with the aim of preventing Belgium from returning to occupy his country, which became independent on June 30, 1960.

The Arab Parachute battalion was made up of 5 companies (4 companies from Egypt and one from Syria), which got the name 'the Arab battalion in the Congo'. The battalion was stationed in the far north, more than 1,200 kilometers from the capital. It was the first Arab force sent to carry out foreign missions under the leadership of the United Nations.

Events developed and General Staff chief Mobutu Sese Seko led a military coup that controlled the country. Lumumba managed to escape, but he was arrested and killed in January 1961.

Gamal Abdel Nasser then sent a military committee headed by Brigadier Ahmed Ismail Ali to Congo to study what Egypt could offer to advance the Congolese army, but the situation had changed. The new government was eradicating hostility from Gamal Abdel Nasser and demanding the return of the Arab forces.  During that period, the dispute occurred between Colonel Al-Shazly and Colonel Ahmed Ismail Ali.

After the killing of Lumumba, Al-Shazly felt in danger and decided unilaterally to leak his soldiers from their positions. He also secured the smuggling of Lumumba's sons to Egypt before the Egyptian battalion withdrew.

Six Day War (1967) 
During the Six-Day War, Shazly showed great merit and tactical awareness. He was positioned in the middle of Sinai with a mixed unit of one infantry battalion, two Sa'ka (Thunderbolt) battalions, and one tank battalion. Following the initial air raid and subsequent superiority of the Israeli Air Force (IAF), the Egyptian command had given a chaotic order for all of its troops to retreat westward which would cause most of them to be mopped by the IAF, especially after most communications were lost between the troops and the Egyptian command; Shazly, however, took the most unbelievable of chances and headed eastward through thin passages, invading Israel itself. He eventually positioned himself in the Negev desert, behind most enemy lines. This feat would have made him one of the few Arab generals to ever successfully take and hold territory inside Israel.

He stayed there with his battalions under the cover of two mountains to avoid IAF bombing for two days, the 6th and 7 June. Finally, he succeeded in making contact with the Egyptian command which ordered him to immediately retreat west of the Suez Canal. He responded with one of the most difficult maneuvers executed in the history of the Egyptian–Israeli conflict, a night march (with mechanized units and tanks accompanying) in the desert and through enemy lines. His unit managed to cover about 60 miles of ground throughout the Sinai, without any air support or intelligence. As dawn broke, the column was spotted by Israeli aircraft, which made low-level passes, bombing and strafing his forces. Lacking anti-aircraft weaponry, his forces could only reply with machine gun and small arms fire. Over 100 of his troops were killed, but the Israeli planes eventually went off in search of other targets, and his column drove on, managing to avoid Israeli ground forces and reaching the Suez Canal. He became the last military commander to pass from the east of the canal to the west.

In the later years, he was highly respected within the Egyptian military for his feats and was eventually granted the command of the combined paratroopers and Sa'ka Forces from which he would move on to be the chief of staff of the Egyptian army and play a major role in the Egyptian major offensive in 1973.

Commander of the Red Sea Military Region 
During the War of Attrition, Israel was conducting lightning raids on the Red Sea region and daily kidnappings of civilians and the destruction of installations on the Red Sea coasts culminating in the incident of Zafarana on September 9, 1969.

Gamal Abdel Nasser saw that General Al-Shazly was the most suitable person who could stop Israel's incursions into the Red Sea region and secure the area and appointed him commander of the Red Sea Military Region in 1970. General Al-Shazly managed to stop the daily kidnappings that were taking place against civilians and employees who were taken as prisoners by the Israeli forces as well as stopping the Israeli attacks.

Shedwan Incident 
On January 22, 1970, Israel attacked the Red Sea island of Shedwan, near the entrance to the Gulf of Suez, 35 kilometers from Hurghada and 325 kilometers from Suez which had a lighthouse to guide ships and a marine radar, secured by an Egyptian thunderbolt, and its military importance was purely because it was an uninhabited rocky island and its area didn't exceed 60 square kilometers.

The Israeli forces bombed the island by air and followed it with the landing of the soldiers by helicopter and the landing boats in an attempt to occupy it, and a small garrison of the Egyptian thunderbolt withstood a huge Israeli fire, and the Israelis announced on the evening of the first fighting night that their forces "found no resistance on the island", except they came back and confessed at three in the afternoon the next day that fighting was still going on on the island.

Maj. Gen. Al-Shazly ordered the attack of the island with the help of a number of fishermen from the governorate, which resulted in the transfer of soldiers and equipment in the dark to Shedwan Island to attack the Israeli forces.

Chief of Staff of the Armed Forces 
On May 16, 1971, after President Anwar Sadat ousted the poles of the Nasser regime, in what he called the correction revolution, he appointed Al-Shazly as chief of staff of the Egyptian armed forces, as he was not affiliated with any of the wrestlers on the Egyptian political scene at the time, and for his competence, his military ability, and the rich background he gained from his studies between the United States of America and the Soviet Union in military sciences as well as his long military career.

Dispute with LT General Muhammad Sadiq 
When Al-Shazly was appointed as Chief of Staff of the Egyptian armed forces, the Minister of War and Commander-in-Chief of the Armed Forces at the time was Lieutenant General Muhammad Sadiq, with whom he entered into disagreements over the operational plan for the liberation of Sinai.

The LT Gen. Muhammad Sadiq was the first to see that the Egyptian Army should not undertake any offensive operation unless it has reached a stage that surpasses the enemy in the equipment and combat efficiency of its soldiers, only then can it carry out a massive offensive operation that destroys Israeli forces in the Sinai and advances to the straits and from there to Gaza.

Al-Shazly's response to his proposals was that he would like this, but this opinion is not in line with the actual capabilities of the armed forces for the weakness of the air force and the lack of a mobile air defense that protects the advanced forces.

Al-Shazly started to develop an offensive plan according to the capabilities of the armed forces, which required the recovery of 10 to 12 km in the depth of Sinai.  He built his opinion that it is important to tailor the war strategy to your capabilities and according to the capabilities of the enemy. However, the LT General, Muhammad Ahmad Sadiq, opposed the plan on the pretext that it does not achieve any political or military goal. From the political point of view, it will achieve nothing and 60,000 square kilometers of Sinai will remain under Israeli control, but militarily it will create, for the Egyptian army a difficult position instead of the current one since it depends on the Suez Canal to act as a natural barrier, while the transportation lines through the bridges erected in the canal will be at the mercy of the Israeli air force.

After lengthy discussions between Al-Shazly and Muhammwd Sadiq, Al-Shazly reached a compromise, which is the preparation of two plans, the first aimed at occupying the Straits, which he called Operation 41 and the second aimed at seizing the Bar Lev Line and called it the Operation Badr, but Muhammad Ahmed Sadiq was not convinced and from his point of view, Egypt would not tolerate another defeat.

On October 26, 1972, Anwar Sadat dismissed Lieutenant General Muhammad Sadiq of the Ministry of War for his disagreement with his vision of liberating the land, his conviction to see Al-Shazly and appointed Field Marshal Ahmed Ismail Ali as Minister of War and Commander-in-Chief of the Armed Forces, who had been referred for retirement in the late days of President Gamal Abdel Nasser, who showed him  Al-Shazly has old differences, but they committed themselves to working with each other to prepare for the October war.

Dispute with Ahmed Ismail Ali 
Colonel Al-Shazly and Colonel Ahmed Ismail Ali coincided with the presence in the Congo in 1960, during which Ahmed Ismail attempted to impose his administrative and military domination on Al-Shazly by virtue of his higher military rank, despite their different tasks and two references. Al-Shazly rejected this logic, and both exchanged rough words until they almost reached the hands clash.  After the leadership in Cairo learned about this, the committee called up and the conflict ended, but its effects remained in the depths of both of them. After the return of Al-Shazly from the Congo, there was no direct contact between them as Ahmed Ismail was in the infantry while Al-Shazly was in the parachute corps.

On March 10, 1969, Al-Shazly was surprised by the appointment of Ahmed Ismail as the Chief of Staff of the Armed Forces after the killing of Lieutenant-General Abdel Moniem Riad on March 9, 1969). Al-Shazly submitted his resignation to the office of the Minister of War, Muhammad Fawzi.  Ahmed Ismail would have contacted him again through the new position, but President Gamal Abdel Nasser intervened and sent his son-in-law, Ashraf Marwan, to El-Shazly, where he persuaded him to return to work after he confirmed to him President Gamal Abdel Nasser’s promise not to contact Ahmed Ismail with him.  Indeed, Ahmed Ismail did not set foot during the six months he spent as chief of staff at the Inshas base, in which Al-Shazly worked as commander of the Special Forces (Thunderbolts and Paratroopers) until Ahmed Ismail was referred to retirement by order of President Gamal Abdel Nasser on September 9, 1969, following the incident of the Israeli raid on Zafarana in the Gulf of Suez.

On October 26, 1972, President Anwar Sadat dismissed Lieutenant General Mohamed Ahmed Sadiq for their disagreement over the transit plan. He appointed Ahmed Ismail as the Minister of War and Commander in Chief of the Armed Forces who before that had been recalled from retirement and appointed by President Anwar Sadat as Director of General Intelligence on May 15, 1971. President Anwar Sadat came to Al-Shazly, and it was a bad surprise for him. He told the president the long history of their differences, which made cooperation between them almost impossible. But President Anwar Sadat assured him that the relationship between them would be good and much better than the previous relationship between him and LT General, Muhammad Sadiq.  Al-Shazly then considered resignation, but two factors prevented him, the first of which was that his resignation would be interpreted as solidarity with  Muhammad Sadiq after the president's sacking, and the second being that some may explain his resignation as that he does not want to enter the war when the truth was the opposite.

High Minarets Plan "Operation Badr" 
This was the plan developed by Al-Shazly to attack the Israeli forces and storm the Suez Canal in August 1971, which he called the "High Minarets" plan:

This plan was drawn up due to the weakness of the Egyptian Air Force and the weak capabilities in the Egyptian Air Defense Command, which prevented a major offensive operation.  However, a limited operation could be carried out to cross the Suez Canal, destroy the Barlev Line and occupy 10 to 12 kilometers east of the canal, which was the maximum range of Egyptian air defense, and then switch to take defensive positions.

The philosophy of this plan was that Israel had two weaknesses:

The first was the inability to withstand human losses due to the small number of its members.

The second was to prolong the duration of the war. In all previous wars, it depended on lightning wars that ended within four or six weeks at the most. Because during this period it mobilized 18% of the Israeli people and this was a very high percentage.  Moreover, the economic situation would be severely affected in Israel due to the interruption of education, agriculture and industry. Because most of those who worked in these institutions were ultimately officers and soldiers in the Israeli armed forces.

The plan had two other dimensions in terms of depriving Israel of its most important combat advantages:

The first: denying him the attack from the sides because the sides of the Egyptian army will be based on the Mediterranean Sea in the north, and on the Gulf of Suez in the south, and will not be able to attack from the rear, which will be the Suez Canal hence he will have to attack in front of it, and pay the heavy price.

The second: The enemy has an important advantage in the confrontational battles, which is the rapid air support of its armored elements, whereby the Western combat doctrine under which Israel operates at the lowest levels of the commanders allows the use of air support, which will lose it because the Egyptian forces will be in the protection of the Egyptian air defense, and from  here, the process of neutralizing Israeli aviation takes place during the battle.

Announcement 41 
Lieutenant General Saad El-Shazly, Chief of Staff of the Egyptian Armed Forces (41) issued a directive clarifying the manner in which soldiers perform their combat duties during the October 1973 war. Guidance 41 is what was implemented in October war operations, and the plan succeeded with overwhelming success. This directive started by placing all problems and difficulties of Egyptian plan to cross the canal and destroy the Bar Lev Line in front of the working group which had to set solutions to each problem. It was the most complex problem that the group had met with and it was the earthen embankment on the east bank of the canal, which gave the Israeli side the advantage of controlling the fire, and the remark against the forces crossing, and this led to the suggestion of the need to build high strong points equipped with terraces of tanks on the West Bank of the Suez Canal, allowing the Egyptian side to secure its forces that cross the channel with fire and information. LT Gen. Al-Shazly had to collect the combat experience from the Egyptian forces' actions and lessons learned immediately after the event, and it will be distributed to members of the armed forces to benefit from them in any future similar operations, for example, guidance for securing radars in isolated areas after they raid Israeli on one of the isolated radars in Zafarana,

and began to issue that directive when the Al-Shazly team was reviewing the offensive operation plan to storm the Suez Canal and destroy the Bar Lev Line, and it was found that there are many problems that hinder and affect the planning of the offensive operation. He ordered his formation of a special committee to prepare this directive as a method for the war plan. After completing this directive, it became the detailed plan for crossing the Suez Canal and storming the Barlev line of the armed forces entirely.

In mid-1973, a few months before the war, Al-Shazly team visited the College of Leaders and Staff and began discussion with students from eight in the morning until seven in the evening. The discussion was completed in two days. This guidance included a detailed plan for the transit of forces; Starting with the number of soldiers in each boat and the arming of each soldier and the size of the ammunition he carries either for himself or for the supporting forces, and the matter reached the timing of the entry of transit equipment to the canal area from rubber boats to bridges equipment and method of protection and locations of smoke generators and air defense etc. The guidance focused on every subtle detail and left leaders with only careful execution.

October War (1973) 

The Israeli army previously made a defensive line called Bar Lev Line that was strengthened with several fortresses at the eastern bank of the Suez canal that is separating the Israeli army from the Egyptian one. It also built a sand barrier 17 meters high at the canal shores to refrain any attempt to cross the canal by the Egyptian army.

At 2 pm 6 October 1973, under General Shazly's command, 200 Egyptian aircraft skimmed low over the canal, headed deep into Sinai and struck the Israeli key forces, while 2000 artillery pieces opened heavy bombardment on the Bar-Lev forts and minefields, under which cover engineer reconnaissance teams paddled over to check the outlets for the Israeli inflammable liquid that had been blocked from the night before. The first assault wave of 4000 men crossed the Suez Canal and opened 70 passages through the sand barrier using high pressure water pumps. Waves of infantry followed crossing the Canal and captured most of the strong points and forts of the Ber lev line. On the next day, 7 October, 5 bridges were assembled over the canal, and the armored divisions began to cross the canal into Sinai. On 8 October, the Israeli counter-attack failed to push the Egyptians back, Israel tried again on 9 October but also suffered heavy losses. Israel lost more than 260 tanks in two days.

After that initial victory, Shazly clashed with president Sadat over Sadat's decision to launch a new offensive to advance towards Sinai Passages. General Shazly strongly opposed any eastward advance that would leave Egyptian forces exposed to IAF without adequate air cover. Sadat insisted and ordered the generals to execute the order which aimed at helping the Syrians. On October 14, the offensive was launched but failed with heavy Egyptian losses. This may have contributed to the success of a daring Israeli operation which pushed its way west in between Egypt's second and third armies and crossed from Sinai into mainland Egypt through the Bitter Lakes. Once again president Sadat refused General Shazly's plan to move some of the Egyptian's armored brigades to fight the Israeli troops.

Legacy
After leaving the army, Shazly wrote his account of the 1973 war.

After the 25 of January revolution in 2011 and removal of Mubarak from the Egyptian government, Shazly was honored by putting his name on the Egyptian Military Academy graduates of the year 2013.

He was awarded the Order of the Nile, Egypt's highest award, in October 2012 by President Mohammed Morsi for his conduct during the 1973 war with Israel.

He was also honored by naming a new highway connecting the Cairo ring road to Ismailia desert road that is being built by the armed forces engineers. Aljazeera documentary channel produced a film about his life in 2012–2013.

Notes

Bibliography
 Shazly, Saad. The Arab Military Option, American Mideast Research (1986).
 Shazly, Saad. The Crossing of the Suez, American Mideast Research (1980: .), (2003: Revised ed.).
 Shazly, Saad. October War (Arabic ed.), American Mideast Research (2004).
 Shazly, Saad. Our Religious Creed Is Our Way to Victory [Aqidatuna ad-Deeniya Tariquna li'l-Nasr], Cairo: Ministry of Defense (1972).

External links
 http://www.El Shazly.com/

1922 births
2011 deaths
People from Gharbia Governorate
Egyptian generals
Egyptian people of the Yom Kippur War
20th-century Egyptian military personnel
Ambassadors of Egypt to the United Kingdom
Ambassadors of Egypt to Portugal
Egyptian Military Academy alumni
Recipients of the Order of the Sinai Star
Chiefs of the General Staff (Egypt)